The 2022–23 Toronto Maple Leafs season is the franchise's 106th season in the National Hockey League.

Standings

Divisional standings

Conference standings

Record vs opponents

Notes
 Game decided in overtime
 Game decided in a shootout

Schedule and results

Preseason

|- style="background:#cfc;"
| 1 || September 24 || Ottawa Senators  || 4–1 ||  || Kallgren (1–0–0) || Scotiabank Arena || 14,532 || 1–0–0 || 
|- style="background:#fcc;"
| 2 || September 24 || Ottawa Senators  || 2–4 ||  || Petruzzelli (0–1–0) || Scotiabank Arena || 14,241 || 1–1–0 || 
|- style="background:#cfc;"
| 3 || September 28 || Montreal Canadiens  || 3–0 ||  || Murray (1–0–0) || Scotiabank Arena || 17,519 || 2–1–0 || 
|- style="background:#cfc;"
| 4 || September 30 || @ Ottawa Senators || 6–3 ||  || Samsonov (1–0–0) || CAA Arena || 4,307 || 3–1–0 || 
|- style="background:#cfc;"
| 5 || October 3 || @ Montreal Canadiens || 5–1 ||  || Murray (2–0–0) || Bell Centre || 19,636 || 4–1–0 || 
|- style="background:#fcc;"
| 6 || October 7 || @ Detroit Red Wings || 2–4 ||  || Samsonov (1–1–0) || Little Caesars Arena || 15,246 || 4–2–0 || 
|- style="background:#cfc;"
| 7 || October 8 || Detroit Red Wings || 5–1 ||  || Murray (3–0–0) || Scotiabank Arena || 18,347 || 5–2–0 || 
|-

Regular season

|- style="background:#fcc;"
| 1 || October 12 || @ Montreal Canadiens || 3–4 ||  || Murray (0–1–0) || Bell Centre || 21,105 || 0–1–0 || 0 || 
|- style="background:#cfc;"
| 2 || October 13 || Washington Capitals || 3–2 ||  || Samsonov (1–0–0) || Scotiabank Arena || 18,914 || 1–1–0 || 2 || 
|- style="background:#cfc;"
| 3 || October 15 || Ottawa Senators || 3–2 ||  || Samsonov (2–0–0) || Scotiabank Arena || 18,709 || 2–1–0 || 4 || 
|- style="background:#fcc;"
| 4 || October 17 || Arizona Coyotes || 2–4 ||  || Kallgren (0–1–0) || Scotiabank Arena || 18,346 || 2–2–0 || 4 || 
|- style="background:#cfc;"
| 5 || October 20 || Dallas Stars || 3–2 || OT || Samsonov (3–0–0) || Scotiabank Arena || 18,488 || 3–2–0 || 6 || 
|- style="background:#cfc;"
| 6 || October 22 || @ Winnipeg Jets || 4–1 ||  || Samsonov (4–0–0) || Canada Life Centre || 15,325 || 4–2–0 || 8 || 
|- style="background:#fcc;"
| 7 || October 24 || @ Vegas Golden Knights || 1–3 ||  || Samsonov (4–1–0) || T-Mobile Arena || 17,989 || 4–3–0 || 8 || 
|- style="background:#ffc;"
| 8 || October 27 || @ San Jose Sharks || 3–4 || OT || Kallgren (0–1–1) || SAP Center || 12,507 || 4–3–1 || 9 || 
|- style="background:#fcc;"
| 9 || October 29 || @ Los Angeles Kings || 2–4 ||  || Samsonov (4–2–0) || Crypto.com Arena || 17,530 || 4–4–1 || 9 || 
|- style="background:#ffc;"
| 10 || October 30 || @ Anaheim Ducks || 3–4 || OT || Kallgren (0–1–2) || Honda Center || 16,084 || 4–4–2 || 10 || 
|-

|- style="background:#cfc;"
| 11 || November 2 || Philadelphia Flyers || 5–2 ||  || Samsonov (5–2–0) || Scotiabank Arena || 18,437 || 5–4–2 || 12 || 
|- style="background:#cfc;"
| 12 || November 5 || Boston Bruins || 2–1 ||  || Samsonov (6–2–0) || Scotiabank Arena || 18,926 || 6–4–2 || 14 || 
|- style="background:#cfc;"
| 13 || November 6 || @ Carolina Hurricanes || 3–1 ||  || Kallgren (1–1–2) || PNC Arena || 18,463 || 7–4–2 || 16 || 
|- style="background:#ffc;"
| 14 || November 8 || Vegas Golden Knights || 3–4 || OT || Kallgren (1–1–3) || Scotiabank Arena || 18,459 || 7–4–3 || 17 || 
|- style="background:#fcc;"
| 15 || November 11 || Pittsburgh Penguins || 2–4 ||  || Kallgren (1–2–3) || Scotiabank Arena || 19,229 || 7–5–3 || 17 || 
|- style="background:#cfc;"
| 16 || November 12 || Vancouver Canucks || 3–2 ||  || Kallgren (2–2–3) || Scotiabank Arena || 19,497 || 8–5–3 || 19 || 
|- style="background:#cfc;"
| 17 || November 15 || @ Pittsburgh Penguins || 5–2 ||  || Murray (1–1–0) || PPG Paints Arena || 17,035 || 9–5–3 || 21 || 
|- style="background:#ffc;"
| 18 || November 17 || New Jersey Devils || 2–3 || OT || Murray (1–1–1) || Scotiabank Arena || 18,189 || 9–5–4 || 22 || 
|- style="background:#cfc;"
| 19 || November 19 || Buffalo Sabres || 5–2 ||  || Murray (2–1–1) || Scotiabank Arena || 18,645 || 10–5–4 || 24 || 
|- style="background:#ffc;"
| 20 || November 21 || New York Islanders || 2–3 || OT || Kallgren (2–2–4) || Scotiabank Arena || 18,494 || 10–5–5 || 25 || 
|- style="background:#cfc;"
| 21 || November 23 || @ New Jersey Devils || 2–1 ||  || Murray (3–1–1) || Prudential Center || 16,514 || 11–5–5 || 27 || 
|- style="background:#cfc;"
| 22 || November 25 || @ Minnesota Wild || 4–3 ||  || Murray (4–1–1) || Xcel Energy Center || 18,997 || 12–5–5 || 29 || 
|- style="background:#cfc;"
| 23 || November 26 || @ Pittsburgh Penguins || 4–1 ||  || Kallgren (3–2–4) || PPG Paints Arena || 18,166 || 13–5–5 || 31 || 
|- style="background:#cfc;"
| 24 || November 28 || @ Detroit Red Wings || 4–2 ||  || Murray (5–1–1) || Little Caesars Arena || 18,277 || 14–5–5 || 33 || 
|- style="background:#cfc;"
| 25 || November 30 || San Jose Sharks || 3–1 ||  || Samsonov (7–2–0) || Scotiabank Arena || 18,679 || 15–5–5 || 35 || 
|-

|- style="background:#ffc;"
| 26 || December 3 || @ Tampa Bay Lightning || 3–4 || OT || Murray (5–1–2) || Amalie Arena || 19,092 || 15–5–6 || 36 || 
|- style="background:#cfc;"
| 27 || December 6 || @ Dallas Stars || 4–0 ||  || Murray (6–1–2) || American Airlines Center || 18,021 || 16–5–6 || 38 || 
|- style="background:#cfc;"
| 28 || December 8 || Los Angeles Kings || 5–0 ||  || Samsonov (8–2–0) || Scotiabank Arena || 18,567 || 17–5–6 || 40 || 
|- style="background:#cfc;"
| 29 || December 10 || Calgary Flames || 5–4 || OT || Murray (7–1–2) || Scotiabank Arena || 18,857 || 18–5–6 || 42 || 
|- style="background:#cfc;"
| 30 || December 13 || Anaheim Ducks || 7–0 ||  || Samsonov (9–2–0) || Scotiabank Arena || 18,477 || 19–5–6 || 44 || 
|- style="background:#fcc;"
| 31 || December 15 || @ New York Rangers || 1–3 ||  || Murray (7–2–2) || Madison Square Garden || 18,006 || 19–6–6 || 44 || 
|- style="background:#fcc;"
| 32 || December 17 || @ Washington Capitals || 2–5 ||  || Samsonov (9–3–0) || Capital One Arena || 18,573 || 19–7–6 || 44 || 
|- style="background:#cfc;"
| 33 || December 20 || Tampa Bay Lightning || 4–1 ||  || Murray (8–2–2) || Scotiabank Arena || 18,962 || 20–7–6 || 46 || 
|- style="background:#cfc;"
| 34 || December 22 || Philadelphia Flyers || 4–3 ||  || Samsonov (10–3–0) || Scotiabank Arena || 18,908 || 21–7–6 || 48 || 
|- style="background:#cfc;"
| 35 || December 27 || @ St. Louis Blues || 5–4 || OT || Samsonov (11–3–0) || Enterprise Center || 18,096 || 22–7–6 || 50 || 
|- style="background:#fcc;"
| 36 || December 29 || @ Arizona Coyotes || 3–6 ||  || Murray (8–3–2) || Mullett Arena || 4,600 || 22–8–6 || 50 || 
|- style="background:#cfc;"
| 37 || December 31 || @ Colorado Avalanche || 6–2 ||  || Murray (9–3–2) || Ball Arena || 18,136 || 23–8–6 || 52 || 
|-

|- style="background:#ffc;"
| 38 || January 3 || St. Louis Blues || 5–6 || SO || Samsonov (11–3–1) || Scotiabank Arena || 18,553 || 23–8–7 || 53 || 
|- style="background:#fcc;"
| 39 || January 5 || Seattle Kraken || 1–5 ||  || Murray (9–4–2) || Scotiabank Arena || 18,624 || 23–9–7 || 53 || 
|- style="background:#cfc;"
| 40 || January 7 || Detroit Red Wings || 4–1 ||  || Samsonov (12–3–1) || Scotiabank Arena || 19,101 || 24–9–7 || 55 || 
|- style="background:#cfc;"
| 41 || January 8 || @ Philadelphia Flyers || 6–2 ||  || Murray (10–4–2) || Wells Fargo Center || 17,862 || 25–9–7 || 57 || 
|- style="background:#cfc;"
| 42 || January 11 || Nashville Predators || 2–1 ||  || Murray (11–4–2) || Scotiabank Arena || 18,638 || 26–9–7 || 59 || 
|- style="background:#fcc;"
| 43 || January 12 || @ Detroit Red Wings || 1–4 ||  || Samsonov (12–4–1) || Little Caesars Arena || 19,515 || 26–10–7 || 59 || 
|- style="background:#fcc;"
| 44 || January 14 || @ Boston Bruins || 3–4 ||  || Murray (11–5–2) || TD Garden || 17,850 || 26–11–7 || 59 || 
|- style="background:#cfc;"
| 45 || January 17 || Florida Panthers || 5–4 || OT || Samsonov (13–4–1) || Scotiabank Arena || 18,573 || 27–11–7 || 61 || 
|- style="background:#cfc;"
| 46 || January 19 || Winnipeg Jets || 4–1 ||  || Samsonov (14–4–1) || Scotiabank Arena || 18,644 || 28–11–7 || 63 || 
|- style="background:#ffc;"
| 47 || January 21 || @ Montreal Canadiens || 2–3 || OT || Samsonov (14–4–2) || Bell Centre || 21,105 || 28–11–8 || 64 || 
|- style="background:#cfc;"
| 48 || January 23 || New York Islanders || 5–2 ||  || Samsonov (15–4–2) || Scotiabank Arena || 18,514 || 29–11–8 || 66 || 
|- style="background:#cfc;"
| 49 || January 25 || New York Rangers || 3–2 || OT || Samsonov (16–4–2) || Scotiabank Arena || 18,114 || 30–11–8 || 68 || 
|- style="background:#fcc;"
| 50 || January 27 || Ottawa Senators || 2–6 ||  || Samsonov (16–5–2) || Scotiabank Arena || 18,727 || 30–12–8 || 68 || 
|- style="background:#cfc;"
| 51 || January 29 || Washington Capitals || 5–1 ||  || Samsonov (17–5–2) || Scotiabank Arena || 18,593 || 31–12–8 || 70 || 
|-

|- style="background:#fcc;"
| 52 || February 1 || Boston Bruins || 2–5 ||  || Samsonov (17–6–2) || Scotiabank Arena || 18,973 || 31–13–8 || 70 || 
|- style="background:#cfc;"
| 53 || February 10 || @ Columbus Blue Jackets || 3–0 || || Samsonov (18–6–2) || Nationwide Arena || 18,860 || 32–13–8 || 72 || 
|- style="background:#fcc;"
| 54 || February 11 || Columbus Blue Jackets || 3–4 ||  || Woll (0–1–0) || Scotiabank Arena || 18,893 || 32–14–8 || 72 || 
|- style="background:#cfc;"
| 55 || February 15 || Chicago Blackhawks || 5–2 ||  || Samsonov (19–6–2) || Scotiabank Arena || 18,882 || 33–14–8 || 74 || 
|- style="background:#cfc;"
| 56 || February 18 || Montreal Canadiens || 5–1 ||  || Woll (1–1–0) || Scotiabank Arena || 19,535 || 34–14–8 || 76 || 
|- style="background:#fcc;"
| 57 || February 19 || @ Chicago Blackhawks || 3–5 ||  || Samsonov (19–7–2) || United Center || 20,979 || 34–15–8 || 76 || 
|- style="background:#cfc;"
| 58 || February 21 || @ Buffalo Sabres || 6–3 ||  || Samsonov (20–7–2) || KeyBank Center || 18,641 || 35–15–8 || 78 || 
|- style="background:#cfc;"
| 59 || February 24 || Minnesota Wild || 2–1 || OT || Samsonov (21–7–2) || Scotiabank Arena || 18,575 || 36–15–8 || 80 || 
|- style="background:#cfc;"
| 60 || February 26 || @ Seattle Kraken || 5–1 ||  || Samsonov (22–7–2) || Climate Pledge Arena || 17,151 || 37–15–8 || 82 || 
|-

|- style="background:#fcc;"
| 61 || March 1 || @ Edmonton Oilers || 2–5 || || Samsonov (22–8–2) || Rogers Place || 18,347 || 37–16–8 || 82 || 
|- style="background:#cfc;"
| 62 || March 2 || @ Calgary Flames || 2–1 ||  || Woll (2–1–0) || Scotiabank Saddledome || 19,289 || 38–16–8 || 84 || 
|- style="background:#fcc;"
| 63 || March 4 || @ Vancouver Canucks || 1–4 ||  || Murray (11–6–2) || Rogers Arena || 18,905 || 38–17–8 || 84 || 
|- style="background:#cfc;"
| 64 || March 7 || @ New Jersey Devils || 4–3 ||  || Samsonov (23–8–2) || Prudential Center || 16,514 || 39–17–8 || 86 || 
|- style="background:#cfc;"
| 65 || March 11 || Edmonton Oilers || 7–4 ||  || Murray (12–6–2) || Scotiabank Arena || 19,549 || 40–17–8 || 88 || 
|- style="background:#fcc;"
| 66 || March 13 || Buffalo Sabres || 3–4 ||  || Murray (12–7–2) || Scotiabank Arena || 18,688 || 40–18–8 || 88 || 
|- style="background:#ffc;"
| 67 || March 15 || Colorado Avalanche || 1–2 || SO || Samsonov (23–8–3) || Scotiabank Arena || 19,102 || 40–18–9 || 89 || 
|- style="background:#cfc;"
| 68 || March 17 || Carolina Hurricanes || 5–2 ||  || Samsonov (24–8–3) || Scotiabank Arena || 18,607 || 41–18–9 || 91 || 
|- style="background:#cfc;"
| 69 || March 18 || @ Ottawa Senators || 5–4 || SO || Murray (13–7–2) || Canadian Tire Centre || 20,092 || 42–18–9 || 93 || 
|- style="background:#;"
| 70 || March 21 || @ New York Islanders || – ||  ||  || UBS Arena ||  ||  ||  || 
|- style="background:#;"
| 71 || March 23 || @ Florida Panthers || – ||  ||  || FLA Live Arena ||  ||  ||  || 
|- style="background:#;"
| 72 || March 25 || @ Carolina Hurricanes || – ||  ||  || PNC Arena ||  ||  ||  || 
|- style="background:#;"
| 73 || March 26 || @ Nashville Predators || – ||  ||  || Bridgestone Arena ||  ||  ||  || 
|- style="background:#;"
| 74 || March 29 || Florida Panthers || – ||  ||  || Scotiabank Arena ||  ||  ||  || 
|-

|- style="background:#;"
| 75 || April 1 || @ Ottawa Senators || – || || ||  || || || ||
|- style="background:#;"
| 76 || April 2 || Detroit Red Wings || – || || ||  || || || ||
|- style="background:#;"
| 77 || April 4 || Columbus Blue Jackets || – || || ||  || || || ||
|- style="background:#;"
| 78 || April 6 || @ Boston Bruins || – || || ||  || || || ||
|- style="background:#;"
| 79 || April 8 || Montreal Canadiens || – || || ||  || || || ||
|- style="background:#;"
| 80 || April 10 || @ Florida Panthers || – || || ||  || || || ||
|- style="background:#;"
| 81 || April 11 || @ Tampa Bay Lightning || – || || ||  || || || ||
|- style="background:#;"
| 82 || April 13 || @ New York Rangers || – || || ||  || || || ||
|-

|-
| 2022–23 schedule

Overtime statistics

Player statistics
Updated to game played March 13, 2023

Skaters

Goaltenders

(M) Player currently playing for the minor league affiliate Toronto Marlies of the AHL 
(X) Player is no longer with the Maple Leafs organization 
Bold/italics denotes franchise record.

Roster

Transactions
The Maple Leafs have been involved in the following transactions during the 2022–23 season.

Key:

 Contract is entry-level.
 Contract initially takes effect in the 2023-24 season.

Trades

Notes:
 Ottawa retains 25% of Murray's remaining contract.
 Chicago retains 50% of McCabe's remaining contract.

Players acquired

Players lost

Signings

Draft Picks

Below are the Toronto Maple Leafs' selections at the 2022 NHL Entry Draft, which was held on July 7 to 8, 2022, at Bell Centre in Montreal.

References

Toronto Maple Leafs seasons
Maple Leafs
Maple Leafs
Toronto Maple Leafs season
Toronto Maple Leafs season